William James Forbes (August 24, 1874 – June 18, 1900) was an American football and baseball coach.  He served as the first ever head football coach at Colorado Agricultural College — now known as Colorado State University — in 1899, compiling a record of 0–2–1. Forbes was also the head baseball coach at the University of Vermont for one season in 1898, tallying a mark of 9–7. He was a native of Shoreham, Vermont.

During Forbes' single season at the school, he led the Colorado Agricultural team in an infamous Thanksgiving Day game against Wyoming that began the Border War rivalry series. 

Forbes was killed in a freak accident on June 18, 1900, in Longmont, Colorado after just one season as head coach at Colorado Agricultural. He was reportedly with a friend in Longmont attending a fire hose team (a group of men who pulled the hose cart to a fire for the local fire department) training drill as a spectator when the team announced they were short by one man. Forbes volunteered to stand in for the missing man despite not having proper running attire. On the team's third lap with the cart, Forbes slipped and fell and one of the cart's large wheels struck him in his back, severely injuring him. He died 30 minutes after the accident in a nearby hospital.

Head coaching record

Football

References

1874 births
1900 deaths
19th-century players of American football
Colorado State Rams football coaches
Vermont Catamounts baseball coaches
Vermont Catamounts football players
Players of American football from Vermont
People from Shoreham, Vermont